Rodolfo Díaz (born 6 July 1936) is an Argentine boxer. He competed in the men's light heavyweight event at the 1956 Summer Olympics.

References

1936 births
Living people
Argentine male boxers
Olympic boxers of Argentina
Boxers at the 1956 Summer Olympics
Place of birth missing (living people)
Light-heavyweight boxers